Kariba may refer to:
 Kariba, Zimbabwe
 Lake Kariba
 Kariba Dam
 Kariba Gorge
 Kariba (District)
 Kariba weed, plant
 For the ship, see MV Tricolor